Richard Patrick Gerald Rodriguez (16 March 1900 – 2 February 1964) was an Australian rules footballer who played for the West Perth Football Club and Subiaco Football Club in the West Australian Football League (WAFL), he was also a long serving administrator in the WAFL.

Football career
He was a prominent player with Subiaco, playing 160 games. He was the WAFL's leading goalkicker in 1920, and played in the Subiaco 1924 premiership team.

He began his administrative career as a delegate for Claremont in 1927. He served as a WAFL vice-president from 1933 until 1941, and then again from (1949–1950). He was elected president of the WAFL in 1951, and was elected president of the Australian National Football Council in 1956. He served in both roles until his death in 1964.

Rodriguez was inducted to the Australian Football Hall of Fame as an administrator in 1996.

Outside football
Outside football, Rodriguez was a prominent lawyer in Perth, serving as city coroner and as a police court magistrate during his career. He served in the navy during World War II, reaching the rank of lieutenant-commander.

References 

 Australian Football Hall of Fame

1900 births
1964 deaths
Australian Football Hall of Fame inductees
Australian rules footballers from Western Australia
Australian rules football administrators
Claremont Football Club administrators
Claremont Football Club coaches
Subiaco Football Club players
West Australian Football Hall of Fame inductees
West Australian Football League administrators
West Perth Football Club players
Australian military personnel of World War II
Lawyers from Perth, Western Australia
Military personnel from Western Australia
Australian people of Spanish descent